Madelung is a German surname. It is also the name of multiple terms in mathematics and science based on people named Madelung.

People
 Erwin Madelung (1881–1972), German physicist
 Georg Hans Madelung (1889–1972), German aeronautical engineer
 Otto Wilhelm Madelung (1846–1926), German surgeon
 Wilferd Madelung (born 1930), German-American author and scholar of Islamic history

Mathematics and science
 Madelung constant, chemical energy of an ion in a crystal, named after Erwin Madelung
 Madelung equations, Erwin Madelung's equivalent alternative formulation of the Schrödinger equation

Medicine
 Madelung's deformity, characterized by malformed wrists and wrist bones, and short stature, named after Otto Wilhelm Madelung
 Madelung's syndrome, also known as "benign symmetric lipomatosis", named after Otto Wilhelm Madelung

German-language surnames